The Nazi gold train or Wałbrzych gold train is an urban legend about a train laden with gold and treasure that was hidden by the Nazis in southwest Poland during the last days of World War II. 
The apocryphal tale claims the train full of valuables, including artwork, was concealed in a sealed-up rail tunnel or mine in the Central Sudetes by retreating Nazis. Despite numerous searches since 1945, including by the Polish Army during the Cold War, no evidence of the train, its tracks or treasure have ever been found. Historians believe the train never existed.

Between 2015 and 2018, the train received renewed global media interest when two Polish men claimed to have discovered it using ground-penetrating radar. The search culminated in a dig involving the Polish military, state officials, and privately-funded individuals. However, excavations were halted when the detected anomaly was found to be natural geology. Interest in the train led a group of enthusiasts to construct a full-size replica of a Nazi armored train with the hope of it becoming a tourist attraction.

Background

According to the apocryphal story, in the last months of World War II, a Nazi armoured train laden with gold and other treasures left Breslau (now Wrocław), arrived at the station Freiburg in Schlesien (Świebodzice), but did not reach the next station in Waldenburg in Schlesien (Wałbrzych). The train is suspected to have entered an abandoned coal mine or tunnel system under Książ Castle, which is part of the unfinished, top secret Nazi construction project Project Riese in the Owl Mountains.

According to historians, it has never been proven that the train ever existed. During the Polish People's Republic (1947–1989), the Polish Armed Forces carried out numerous searches for the train but found nothing.

Search on the "65th kilometer" 

In late August 2015, news stories began circulating about two unidentified men who had obtained a death-bed confession about a buried gold train. The two were later identified as Piotr Koper of Poland and Andreas Richter of Germany, co-owners of the mine exploration company XYZ S.C. Using lawyers as an intermediary, the two men opened secret negotiations with the Polish government for a "finders' fee" of 10% of the value of the train in return for information leading to its location. They would reveal the exact location once the documents were signed.

Koper and Richter would later claim information about their discovery was leaked by the government, resulting in a worldwide media circus.

On 28 August, Polish Deputy Culture Minister Piotr Żuchowski announced that ground-penetrating radar images taken by Koper and Richter confirmed with 99% probability that a train of 100 metres in length had been found. However, on August 31, Tomasz Smolarz, Governor of the Lower Silesian Voivodeship, told reporters that "There is no more proof for this alleged discovery than for other claims made over the years," saying, "It's impossible to claim that such a find actually exists at the location indicated based on the documents that have been submitted."

On 4 September, Koper and Richter went public for the first time, breaking their previous anonymity. They announced that the precise location of the train had been given to Polish authorities. They also released images they had taken with a KS-700 Ground Penetrating Radar system that appeared to show a 50-metre-deep man-made shaft with something in it. Koper and Richter believed the train was buried next to a  stretch of track on Polish State Railways' Wrocław–Wałbrzych line at kilometre 65.

Polish authorities sectioned off woodland in the area of kilometer 65, as well as deploying police and other guards in order to prevent access to the numerous treasure hunters who had arrived armed with detection equipment. In late September, the Polish military, acting at the request of the regional governor, began to clear the surface of trees and search for booby traps and mines. The military confirmed on October 4 that no explosives or other dangers existed, down to a metre's depth.

In mid-November, two different teams were cleared by city authorities in Wałbrzych to make a non-invasive assessment of the site. The first team was Koper and Richter. The second team consisted of mining specialists from the Kraków Mining Academy, headed by Janusz Madej. On 15 December, the second team announced that a survey had found no evidence of a train, though possible evidence of a collapsed tunnel. Koper and Richter stood by their claim of a train to which Madej responded: "It's human to make a mistake, but it's foolish to stand by it."

In May 2016, despite outside expert opinion that no train existed, Koper and Richter secured permission to begin digging at the site from the owners of the property, Polish State Railways. The excavation commenced on 15 August 2016 with a team of 64 people, including engineers, geologists, chemists, archaeologists and a specialist in military demolitions. The excavation reportedly cost 116,000 euros or $131,000 and was financed by private sponsors, and with the help of volunteers.

The dig was halted after seven days when no tracks, tunnel or train were found. The radar images thought to have been the train were revealed to be natural ice formations. An official from the town admitted tourism was up 44% for the year and said "the publicity the town has gotten in the global media is worth roughly around $200 million. Our annual budget for promotion is $380,000, so think about that. Whether the explorers find anything or not, that the gold train has already arrived." The town mayor was considering naming a roundabout after Koper and Richter.

At the beginning of December 2016, Koper and Richter declared their intention to create a foundation for the purpose of raising money to drill down to 20 meters in 2017. During the third search in June 2017, with the assistance of a geophysical company from Warsaw, the excavation team encountered seven cavities, which were suspected to be a railway tunnel. The find made deep drilling necessary, which, according to the contractors, would cost at least 100,000 zlotys (about 23,000 euros) for the permits and the actual excavation. The dig was scheduled for the spring or summer of 2018, when sponsors would be found.

In August 2018, Richter left the excavation team. Koper announced he would continue the search. While he never found Nazi gold, in January 2019, Koper discovered a series of large and "priceless" 16th-century wall paintings hidden behind a plaster wall while doing renovation work in an old palace in the village of Struga near Wrocław.

See also 
 Hungarian Gold Train
 Confederate gold
 Amber Room
 Die Glocke (conspiracy theory)
 Gross-Rosen concentration camp
 Project Riese
 Książ Castle
 Wałbrzych
 Mausoleum in Wałbrzych

References

External links 
 Facebook page of the dig
  — includes chronological history of story with hyperlinks to original sources of information.
  — includes maps of possible locations

1945 in Germany
1945 in military history
1945 in rail transport
January 1945 events in Europe
Cultural history of World War II
German legends
History of rail transport in Germany
History of Silesia
Legendary objects
Lower Silesian Voivodeship
Missing trains
Nazi Germany
Nazi subterranea
Poland in World War II
Polish folklore
Polish legends
Silesian culture
Sudetes
Treasure of Poland
Urban legends
Wałbrzych
Legendary treasures